The Yiyang–Zhanjiang railway or Yizhan railway, is a railway in China between Hunan, Guangxi and Guangdong. The line was built at the beginning of the 21st century as the southern part of a rail corridor called the Luozhan railway running from Luoyang to Zhanjiang. The part of the line between Loudi and Shaoyang is electrified and has two tracks.

History
Yiyang–Zhanjiang railway was built as part of the Luozhan rail corridor, which runs through four provinces and one autonomous region—Henan, Hubei, Hunan, Guangxi and Guangdong—and is designed to facilitate the shipment of goods from the Chinese interior to the Port of Zhanjiang. The rail corridor was proposed in 1999 and is a combination of pre-existing railways and new railway sections built as part of the new route. The new railway sections filled a gap in the railway network of South Central China between the Beijing-Guangzhou and Jiaozuo–Liuzhou railways. The Luozhan line is composed of seven sections, consisting of three pre-existing railways built prior to 1999, and four new railway sections built for the Luozhan line. From Luoyang, the line follows the pre-existing Jiaozuo–Liuzhou railway to Shimen in northern Hunan Province. From Shimen, the line follows the pre-existing Shimen–Changsha railway through Changde to Yiyang, in north central Hunan. 

A single-track and non-electrified line with construction starting in December 2000 and opened between Yiyang and Shaoyang in July 2006. From Yongzhou, a new,  railway to Yulin in eastern Guangxi Autonomous Region via Lingling, Dao County, Jianghua, Fuchuan, Zhongshan County, Hezhou, Wuzhou, Cenxi, Rong County (Guangxi) and Beiliu, was built from December 2004 to July 2009.

From Yulin, the Luozhan line, as originally planned, follows the pre-existing Litang–Zhanjiang railway to Zhanjiang, in southwestern Guangdong Province. Subsequently  a more direct route was built to Zhanjiang in eastern Guangxi via Cenxi, just north of Yulin,  and Maoming. From Cenxi, a  single-track electrified section to Maoming in neighboring Guangdong via Xinyi and Gaozhou opened on January 3, 2011. From Maoming, a  section to Zhanjiang, opened on December 28, 2013.

Rail connections
 : Maluwei–Yulin railway to

See also
 List of railways in China

References

Railway lines in China
Rail transport in Hunan
Rail transport in Guangxi
Rail transport in Guangdong
25 kV AC railway electrification